Farlowella martini is a species of armored catfish endemic to Venezuela where it occurs in the coastal rivers draining into the Caribbean Sea.  This species grows to a length of  SL.

References 
 

martini
Fish of Venezuela
Endemic fauna of Venezuela
Fish described in 1972